Péronnas is a commune in the Ain department in the Auvergne-Rhône-Alpes region in eastern France.

Geography

The Veyle forms part of the commune's western border.

Population

Sport and leisure

Péronnas has a football club FC Bourg-Péronnas who play at the Stade Municipal de Péronnas. They are currently playing in the Ligue 2, the second tier of French football.

See also
Communes of the Ain department

References

Communes of Ain
Ain communes articles needing translation from French Wikipedia